Donald Thomas Hanski (February 27, 1916 – September 2, 1957) was a first baseman in Major League Baseball. He played for the Chicago White Sox. His birth name was Donald Thomas Hanyzewski.  He used Hanski as his professional name but did not legally change it until 1954.  His cousin was Ed Hanyzewski who played for the Chicago Cubs during the 1940s.

During 1943 and 1944, due to World War II travel restrictions, baseball teams were not allowed to travel to Arizona or California for spring training.  Both the Sox and the Chicago Cubs held their spring training in French Lick, Indiana.  The training was held at the French Lick Spring Hotel.

References

External links

1916 births
1957 deaths
Major League Baseball first basemen
Chicago White Sox players
Baseball players from Indiana
People from La Porte, Indiana